Rubén Pérez Moreno (born 30 October 1981 in Zaldibar, Basque Country) is a Spanish Basque professional road bicycle racer, who last rode for UCI ProTour team .

His only victory has been a stage in the Tour of Bavaria in 2010, before that he made his Vuelta a España debut (69th) in 2006 and his Tour de France debut in 2007.

Major results

1997
2nd National Under-17 Cyclo-Cross Championships
2009
5th Clásica de Almería
8th Clásica de San Sebastián
2010
1st Stage 1 Bayern-Rundfahrt
4th Gran Premio Miguel Indurain
9th Trofeo Magaluf
9th Clásica de Almería
2013
7th Circuito de Getxo

References

External links 

1981 births
Living people
Cyclists from the Basque Country (autonomous community)
People from Durangaldea
Sportspeople from Biscay
Spanish male cyclists